"Look Back" is a song by Norwegian singer Tone Damli from her fifth studio album Looking Back (2012). It was released in Norway on 27 April 2012. The song has peaked to number 8 on the Norwegian Singles Chart.

Music video
A music video to accompany the release of "Look Back" was first released onto YouTube on 29 January 2012 at a total length of four minutes and eleven seconds.

Track listing

Chart performance

References

2012 singles
Tone Damli songs
2011 songs